The Austria women's national under-16 basketball team is a national basketball team of Austria, administered by the Austrian Basketball Federation. It represents the country in women's international under-16 basketball competitions.

The team finished 12th at the 1984 European Championship for Cadettes. They also participated at several FIBA U16 Women's European Championship Division B tournaments and won gold medal at the 2018 FIBA U16 Women's European Championship Division C.

See also
Austria women's national basketball team
Austria women's national under-18 basketball team
Austria men's national under-16 basketball team

References

External links
Archived records of Austria team participations

B
Women's national under-16 basketball teams